Rt. Hon. Lord Claud John Hamilton   (20 February 1843 – 26 January 1925) was a British Member of Parliament (MP) during the Victorian era, and a noted railway director.

Family and education
Born the second son of James Hamilton, 2nd Marquess of Abercorn (later the 1st Duke of Abercorn) and his wife Lady Louisa Jane Russell, Hamilton was educated at Harrow School.

He married Carolina Chandos-Pole (19 July 1857 – 21 September 1911) (a granddaughter of the 5th Earl of Harrington) on 20 July 1878 and they had two children:
Gilbert Claud Hamilton (1879–1943), who gained the rank of colonel in service of the Grenadier Guards, fought in the Second Boer War and was decorated several times. He married twice, firstly in 1911 Enid Awa Elgar (1892-1916), daughter of Charles Elgar from Fernside, Featherston, New Zealand, and secondly in 1916 Mary Blair (died 1961), daughter of Joseph Allan Blair from New York City, USA. He had no issue.
Ida Hamilton (1883–1970), who in 1909 married Hugh Duncombe Flower (1878-1950). They divorced in 1923 and had one son.

Military and political careers
Hamilton served in the British Army, firstly in the Grenadier Guards, and later in the Royal Inniskilling Fusiliers, before turning to political life.

In 1865, he became Conservative MP for Londonderry City until 1868 when he was appointed a Lord of the Treasury in Benjamin Disraeli's first ministry. In 1869, he became MP for King's Lynn until 1880, for Liverpool from 1880 to 1885, for Liverpool West Derby from 1885 until he resigned his seat in 1888, and for Kensington South from January 1910 to 1918.

Lord Claud had been an aide-de-camp to Queen Victoria from 1887 to 1897 and was appointed to the Privy Council in 1917.

Great Eastern Railway
However his principal contribution to British public life was as a director of the Great Eastern Railway (GER) from 1872, becoming vice-chairman in 1874, and chairman in 1893, continuing as chairman until 1922. The GER operated from London's Liverpool Street station to major eastern towns and cities including Cambridge, Norwich, Ipswich, Chelmsford, and Colchester. Hamilton travelled the network extensively. "He devoted the main energies of his life to the company, constantly travelling over the system, observing its conduct and operation". The shares of the company (which had been bankrupt in 1866) rose from 76, shortly after he became a director, to par in 1896, and the dividend to 6% in 1901.

In 1900, the Great Eastern Railway named the first of its new class of 4-4-0 express passenger locomotives (designed by James Holden and designated GER Classes S46, D56 and H88 ) after its chairman, and the whole class came to be known as the "Claud Hamilton" type.

Death

Hamilton died on 26 January 1925, and was buried in Richmond Cemetery. He was 81 years of age.

Legacy
A memorial was erected by Ida Flower in 1925 to the memory of her father.  It can be found on the south wall of St John's-Hyde Park Church, London, W2.

Ancestry

References

See also
History of the associated clubs of the Apprentice Boys of Derry

External links 
 
 
 

1843 births
1925 deaths
Members of the Parliament of the United Kingdom for County Londonderry constituencies (1801–1922)
Irish Conservative Party MPs
Knights of Justice of the Order of St John
People educated at Harrow School
Members of the Privy Council of the United Kingdom
Younger sons of dukes
UK MPs 1865–1868
UK MPs 1868–1874
UK MPs 1874–1880
UK MPs 1880–1885
UK MPs 1885–1886
UK MPs 1886–1892
UK MPs 1910
UK MPs 1910–1918
Members of the Parliament of the United Kingdom for Liverpool
Directors of the Great Eastern Railway
Conservative Party (UK) MPs for English constituencies
Burials at Richmond Cemetery